Adam Schwadron is an American politician and businessman serving as a member of Missouri House of Representatives from the 106th district. Elected in November 2020, he assumed office on January 6, 2021.

Early life and education 
A native of St. Louis, Schwadron attended Ladue Horton Watkins High School. He earned an Associate of Arts in business administration from St. Louis Community College–Meramec and a Bachelor of Arts degree in political science from University of Missouri–St. Louis.

Career 
In 2007, Schwadron worked as an account manager for Election Administrators. From 2007 to 2009, he was a territory sales manager for Dyson. He has worked as director of operations for the Clean Carpet Company since 2010. Schwadron was elected to the Missouri House of Representatives in November 2020 and assumed office on January 6, 2021.

Electoral History 
 Rep. Schwadron has not yet had any opponents in the Republican primaries, thus automatically getting nominated each time by default.

References 

Living people
Republican Party members of the Missouri House of Representatives
St. Louis Community College alumni
University of Missouri–St. Louis alumni
People from St. Louis County, Missouri
Politicians from St. Louis
Politicians from St. Louis County, Missouri
Year of birth missing (living people)